Percy Jackson: Sea of Monsters (also known as Percy Jackson & the Olympians: The Sea of Monsters and Percy Jackson and the Sea of Monsters) is a 2013 fantasy adventure film directed by Thor Freudenthal from a screenplay Marc Guggenheim, based on the 2006 novel The Sea of Monsters by Rick Riordan. The sequel to Percy Jackson & the Olympians: The Lightning Thief (2010), it is the second and final installment in the Percy Jackson film series. 

The film continues the adventures of Percy Jackson (Logan Lerman) and his friends as they journey to the eponymous Sea of Monsters to retrieve the Golden Fleece in order to save the tree barrier that protects their home. Brandon T. Jackson, Alexandra Daddario, and Jake Abel reprise their roles from the previous film, while Nathan Fillion and Anthony Head replace Dylan Neal and Pierce Brosnan, respectively. New additions to the cast include Leven Rambin, Douglas Smith, and Stanley Tucci.

Percy Jackson: Sea of Monsters was released theatrically in the United States on August 7, 2013, by 20th Century Fox. The film received mixed reviews from critics, with praise for its visuals, action sequences, and Lerman's performance, but criticism for its plot, characters, unfaithfulness to the source material, and ending. It grossed $200.9 million worldwide against a production budget of $90 million. A sequel based on The Titan's Curse was planned, but never produced. Following the acquisition of 21st Century Fox by Disney in 2019, Disney consequently gained the rights to the Percy Jackson novels, upon which Riordan pitched a new adaptation, set to be produced as a television series for Disney+.

Plot

Percy Jackson recounts the story of Thalia Grace: Pursued by monsters on their way to Camp Half-Blood, a young Thalia sacrificed herself to save her friends, Annabeth Chase, Luke Castellan and Grover Underwood. Her father Zeus honored her sacrifice by turning her into a tree, which forms a protective barrier around the camp, keeping everyone within a safe zone. In the present day, Percy's quest for Zeus's bolt has faded in popularity and he is called a one-quest wonder by camp bully Clarisse La Rue, but is still supported by Annabeth and Grover. He is joined at camp by a young cyclops named Tyson, a previously unknown son of Poseidon, and therefore his brother, albeit the son of Poseidon and a sea-nymph, rather than a human.

After an attack by a Colchis bull, the campers discover Thalia's tree has been poisoned by Luke and the barrier is vulnerable. Percy consults the Oracle, who tells him of a prophecy of a half-blood of the eldest gods either saving or destroying Olympus. Chiron tells Percy that he is the only living human half-blood of the eldest gods, so the Prophecy may refer to him. Annabeth and Grover learn about the Golden Fleece, which has the power to heal anything and propose a quest to retrieve the Fleece and use it to heal Thalia's tree. Counsellor Mr. D claims the idea as his and chooses Clarisse to lead the quest.

Percy and Annabeth set off without being chosen, joined by Tyson. They leave camp on the Chariot of Damnation (a New York City cab), where the three drivers (the Graeae) tell Percy more about his prophecy and coordinates for the Sea of Monsters (the Bermuda Triangle). The group are ejected in Washington D.C. for lacking drachmas, where Grover is kidnapped. The others, with the help of Hermes, track him down to Luke's yacht, the Andromeda, which they reach riding Hippokamposes. On board, they meet Luke (joined by other disillusioned demi-gods,) who reveals his plan to have Kronos the titan destroy Olympus by reviving him with the fleece and locks the group in the brig, but Percy uses his ability to manipulate water to break them free.

Escaping the yacht, they are consumed by Charybdis, where they discover Clarisse also in the monster's stomach. They work together to escape by shooting a hole through Charybdis's gut, then chart a course to Circeland, off the coast of Florida. There they discover Polyphemus's lair, where the fleece is kept and Grover is in disguise working for the cyclops. They rescue Grover, retrieve the fleece and trap Polyphemus in his cave. Luke ambushes them and shoots at Percy with a crossbow for not handing over the fleece, but Tyson takes the bolt and falls into a roaring stream. Luke takes the fleece and the group hostage.

As Luke begins reviving Kronos from his sarcophagus, Annabeth encourages Percy to take leadership. The team escapes and Percy fights Luke over the fleece. Luke defeats Percy but he is saved by Tyson, who survived his injury by being healed by the water, as he is Poseidon's son. Kronos rises from the sarcophagus and consumes Luke, Grover and several other demi-gods before battling Percy. Percy realizes that his sword is the "cursed blade" of the prophecy and slices Kronos into pieces imprisoning the titan in the sarcophagus once again. Those eaten are regurgited with Luke landing in Polyphemus's Lair and is presumably eaten. Annabeth is impaled by the Manticore and dies in Percy's arms, but is resurrected by the fleece.

Percy gives the fleece to Clarisse and they return to Camp Half-Blood, where she places it on Thalia's tree. The next day Thalia is found alive, as the fleece was powerful enough to resurrect and return her to human form, while keeping the tree as protection for Camp Half-blood. Percy realizes that Thalia, as the daughter of Zeus, is another possible child referred to in the prophecy about Olympus.

Cast

Demigods
 Logan Lerman as Percy Jackson, son of Poseidon.
 Alexandra Daddario as Annabeth Chase, daughter of Athena, and Percy's secret crush.
 Alisha Newton portrays a younger Annabeth.
 Douglas Smith as Tyson, Percy's Cyclops half-brother.
 Leven Rambin as Clarisse La Rue, daughter of Ares.
 Brandon T. Jackson as Grover Underwood, a satyr and Percy's best friend and protector.
 Bjorn Yearwood portrays a younger Grover.
 Jake Abel as Luke Castellan, son of Hermes and the main antagonist.
 Samuel Braun portrays a younger Luke.
 Paloma Kwiatkowski as Thalia Grace, daughter of Zeus.
 Katelyn Mager portrays a younger Thalia.
 Grey Damon as Chris Rodriguez, a rogue demigod of unknown parentage who joins Luke on his quest to resurrect Kronos.

Gods
 Stanley Tucci as Mr. D / Dionysus, the god of wine, celebrations, ecstasy, and theatre and director of Camp Half-Blood. He was previously played by Luke Camilleri in the first film.
 Nathan Fillion as Hermes, Luke's father; the god of trade, thieves, travelers, sports, athletes, and messenger of the gods of Mount Olympus. He was previously played by Dylan Neal in the first film.
 Octavia Spencer and Craig Robinson as the voices of Martha and George respectively, the snakes in Hermes' caduceus.
 Robert Knepper as the voice of Kronos, the King of the Titans, father of Zeus, Poseidon, Hades, Hestia, Demeter, Hera and Chiron, and Luke's master.

Other characters
 Anthony Head as Chiron, the activities director at Camp Half-Blood. Chiron is a centaur and the immortal son of Kronos and brother of Zeus, Poseidon, Hades, Demeter, Hestia and Hera. Chiron was previously played by Pierce Brosnan in The Lightning Thief.
 Robert Maillet as the motion capture of Polyphemus, an angry cyclops who keeps the Fleece with him.
 Ron Perlman as the voice of Polyphemus
 Hunter Platin as Guard, the Cyclops that guards the Golden Fleece.
 Shohreh Aghdashloo as the voice of Oracle of Delphi
 Missi Pyle, Yvette Nicole Brown and Mary Birdsong as the Graeae
 Jordan Weller as Ichneutae, the acolyte of Clarisse.
 Derek Mears and Aleks Paunovic as Cyclopes.

Production
Reports of a second Percy Jackson film first surfaced in March 2011. On October 12, 2011, a sequel was officially confirmed by 20th Century Fox. Filming for Percy Jackson: Sea of Monsters began on April 16, 2012. The film was originally going to be released on March 15, 2013, but in May 2012, the release date was postponed to August 16, 2013. In April 2013, a final release date was set for August 7, 2013. Filming took place in Robert Burnaby Park in Burnaby, B.C.; however from June 20 to July 22, they filmed in New Orleans for Princess Andromeda scenes, including the former site of Six Flags New Orleans. More filming took place in January 2013. On January 22, 2013, Logan Lerman released a statement on Twitter that read "Last day of shooting on Percy Jackson 2" accompanied by a photo of the shooting.

Development

In February 2011, it was revealed in the online subscription magazine Production Weekly that the film was in production. In another source, the lead cast members from the first movie were expected to return for their roles. Chris Columbus would not be returning as director, though he would be producing the movie together with Karen Rosenfelt (producer of the Twilight movie Breaking Dawn). Scott Alexander and Larry Karaszewski were hired as the scriptwriters. Marc Guggenheim was hired to re-write the screenplay and Alexander and Karaszewski were uncredited. On June 16, 2011, it was announced that Thor Freudenthal would be directing the movie. Shooting began in summer 2012. On October 12, 2011, it was announced that the film would be released on March 26, 2013. On April 6, it was announced that the movie was pushed up to August 7, 2013. On May 31, 2012, it was announced that the movie had been pushed back to August 16, 2013.

Filming
On January 13, 2012, a brand new production list was released and stated that filming would take place between April 26, 2012 and July 11, 2012. It was filmed in Vancouver, British Columbia, and New Orleans, Louisiana, with the abandoned Six Flags New Orleans serving as the filming location for the island of Polyphemus. Filming wrapped up in July 2012, with reshoots taking place in January 2013.

Reception

Critical response
On Rotten Tomatoes, the film has an approval rating of 42% based on reviews from 118 critics, with an average rating of 5.20/10. The website's consensus reads, "It's pretty and packed with action; unfortunately, Percy Jackson: Sea of Monsters is also waterlogged with characters and plots that can't help but feel derivative." On Metacritic, the film has a weighted average score of 39 based on 33 collected reviews, indicating "generally unfavorable reviews". Audiences polled by CinemaScore gave the film an average grade of "B+" on a scale from A+ to F, the same grade earned by the previous film.

Jim Vejvoda of IGN rated the movie a six out of ten: "There are worse sequels than the CG-heavy Percy Jackson: Sea of Monsters, but it's just such overly familiar territory." Gary Goldstein of the Los Angeles Times gave the film a positive review, saying that "tweens and young teens should be sufficiently distracted by the movie's brisk pace and heroic mayhem — if they're not too unnerved by its at times nightmarish imagery". James Rocchi of ScreenCrush wrote that the film "is hardly the stuff of legend, but by keeping the plot straightforward and the storytelling clean, it's an odyssey the intended young audience will be glad to take." Marsha McCreadie on RogerEbert.com rated the film two and a half stars out of four, calling it "a gentler-spirited, less flashy enterprise, though it still presents a natural world that can morph at the whim of a god."

Andy Webster of The New York Times commented: "Sea of Monsters is diverting enough — the director, Thor Freudenthal ... is savvy with effects and keeps his young cast on point — but it doesn’t begin to approach the biting adolescent tension of the Harry Potter movies." However, Michael Rechtshaffen of The Hollywood Reporter criticized the film as "lack[ing] the energetic zip of its predecessor," while Bruce Ingram of Chicago Sun-Times opined that "faithful fans of the novels will be unhappy with the liberties taken with the adaptation like they were with the first film." Connie Ogle of The Miami Herald wrote, "[Are] these characters merely prisoners — much like the audience — of a script so uninspired that it demands their stupidity?" Josh Bell of Las Vegas Weekly lambasted the series as a whole as "a thoroughly second-rate franchise ... with movies like Sea of Monsters, it can probably continue in acceptable mediocrity for years to come".

Box office
Percy Jackson: Sea of Monsters grossed $68,559,554 in North America and $133,688,197 internationally for a worldwide total of $202,247,751.

The film grossed $5.4 million on its opening day, taking the number No. 2 spot at the domestic box office. During its extended five-day opening weekend the film debuted at the No. 4 spot and grossed $23,258,113.

Accolades
Katelyn Mager was nominated for her performance at the 2014 Young Artist Award as Best Supporting Young Actress in a Feature Film.

Soundtrack

The film's score was composed by Andrew Lockington. "My Songs Know What You Did in the Dark (Light Em Up)" by Fall Out Boy and "Cameo Lover" by Kimbra were featured in the movie but are not included in the soundtrack.

Home media
The film was released on 3D Blu-ray, Blu-ray, and DVD on December 17, 2013. The film was additionally released for Digital HD download on December 3.

Future

Cancelled sequel
On March 25, 2014, Lerman stated that a sequel to Sea of Monsters would not be made. However, six days later, another report stated "Logan Lerman has said Percy Jackson 3 could still go ahead" and that the previous report "was taken out of context". At the 2015 Santa Barbara International Film Festival, Lerman said that while he finds the Percy Jackson films fun to make, he has not heard anything about the production of a third film and expressed concern that he and his co-stars were growing too old for their parts.

Disney+ reboot series

The rights to the Percy Jackson novels were transferred to Disney following its acquisition of 21st Century Fox in 2019, upon which Riordan pitched a new adaptation in September of that year. On May 14, 2020, a Disney+ series separate from the Fox film series was announced on Riordan's Twitter account, where he stated that he and his wife Becky would be involved in the production of the series. Each season of the series will adapt one installment of the book series, with the first season being an adaptation of The Lightning Thief. The series was greenlit in January 2022, began production in June 2022, and is scheduled to premiere in early 2024. Walker Scobell, Leah Sava Jeffries and Aryan Simhadri will respectively portray the three main characters Percy Jackson, Annabeth Chase and Grover Underwood.

References

External links
 
 
 

2013 3D films
2013 fantasy films
2010s children's adventure films
2010s children's fantasy films
2010s English-language films
2010s fantasy adventure films
2010s teen fantasy films
1492 Pictures films
20th Century Fox films
American children's adventure films
American children's fantasy films
American fantasy adventure films
American sequel films
Films about giants
Films about witchcraft
Films based on American novels
Films based on fantasy novels
Films based on classical mythology
Films directed by Thor Freudenthal
Films produced by Michael Barnathan
Films produced by Karen Rosenfelt
Films scored by Andrew Lockington
Films set in Bermuda
Films set in the Bermuda Triangle
Films set in Washington, D.C.
Films shot in New Orleans
Films shot in Vancouver
Percy Jackson & the Olympians
Teen adventure films
TSG Entertainment films
2010s American films